Krylovo is a rural locality (a village) in Kupriyanovskoye Rural Settlement, Gorokhovetsky District, Vladimir Oblast, Russia. The population was 19 as of 2010. In 2020 another population count will occur- it is assumed that the population has substantially decreased due to the extreme environment and weather.

Geography 
Krylovo is located 16 km southeast of Gorokhovets (the district's administrative centre) by road. Kartaganovo is the nearest rural locality.

References 

Rural localities in Gorokhovetsky District